Tin Angel may refer to:
 The Tin Angel, an album by Odetta & Larry
 "Tin Angel", a song by Bob Dylan from the album Tempest
 "Tin Angel", a song by Joni Mitchell from the album Clouds
 Tin Angel Records, a British record label